Konstantin Shcharbak is a Belarusian sprint canoer who has been competing since 2005. He won four medals at the ICF Canoe Sprint World Championships with a gold (C-4 500 m: 2006), two silvers (C-4 200 m: 2006, C-4 500 m: 2005), and one bronze (C-4 200 m: 2007).

References

Belarusian male canoeists
Living people
Year of birth missing (living people)
ICF Canoe Sprint World Championships medalists in Canadian